Nationality words link to articles with information on the nation's poetry or literature (for instance, Irish or France).

Events
 February – The Club, a London dining club, is founded by Samuel Johnson and Joshua Reynolds.

Works published
 Charles Churchill (see "Deaths", below):
 The Candidate
 The Duelist
 The Farewell
 Gotham, Books 1, 2 and 3 published separately this year
 Independence, published anonymously
 The Times
 John Gilbert Cooper, Poems on Several Subjects
James Grainger, The Sugar Cane, by a British doctor in Saint Kitts
 Edward Jerningham, The Nun
 Mary Latter, Liberty and Interest
 William Mason, Poems
 Benjamin Youngs Prime, The Patriotic Muse, English, Colonial America
 Christopher Smart, translator, A Poetical Translation of the Fables of Phaedrus
 Thomas Warton, editor, The Oxford Sausage; or, Select Poetical Pieces, anthology of verse and Oxford wit
 James Woodhouse, Poems on Sundry Occasions

Births
Death years link to the corresponding "[year] in poetry" article:
 February 11 – Marie-Joseph de Chenier (died 1811), French
 February 15 – Jens Baggesen (died 1826), Danish
 July 27 – John Thelwall (died 1834), radical English orator, writer, elocutionist and poet
 August 18 – Judah Leib Ben-Ze'ev (died 1811), Galician Hebrew philologist, lexicographer, Biblical scholar and poet
 November 24 – Ulrika Widström (died 1841), Swedish poet and translator.
 December 2 – Hendrik Doeff (died 1837), the first westerner to write haiku in Japanese

Deaths
Birth years link to the corresponding "[year] in poetry" article:
 May 10 – Christian Friedrich Henrici, known as "Picander" (born 1700), German
 September 23 – Robert Dodsley (born 1703), English bookseller, poet, dramatist and anthologist
 November 4 – Charles Churchill (born 1732), English poet and satirist (see "Works", above)
 December 15 – Robert Lloyd (born 1733), English poet and satirist, died in Fleet Prison

See also

Poetry
List of years in poetry

Notes

18th-century poetry
Poetry